Bob Gordon (June 11, 1928 – August 28, 1955) was an American cool jazz baritone saxophonist born in St. Louis, Missouri, best known as a sideman for musicians like Stan Kenton, Shelly Manne, Chet Baker, Maynard Ferguson, Herbie Harper and Jack Montrose. He released one album as a bandleader. Gordon died in a car accident on his way to playing at a Pete Rugolo concert in San Diego.

Career
His friend saxophonist Jack Montrose wrote, "The union of Bob Gordon and the baritone saxophone must have been decreed in Heaven, for never have I viewed such rapport between the natural tendencies of a musical instrument and the mind of the man using it. I cannot imagine Bob Gordon using any other instrument".

Discography

As leader/co-leader
 1953: Moods in Jazz, with Herbie Harper (Tampa)
 1954: Herbie Harper featuring Bud Shank and Bob Gordon (Liberty)
 1954: Meet Mr. Gordon (Pacific Jazz)
 1955: Jack Montrose with Bob Gordon (Atlantic)
 1955: Introducing Bob Gordon (EmArcy)
 2004: Bob Gordon Memorial (Fresh Sound)

As sideman
With Chet Baker
 Grey December (Pacific Jazz, 1953)
 The Trumpet Artistry of Chet Baker (Pacific Jazz, 1953)

With Pete Rugolo
 Introducing Pete Rugolo (Columbia, 1954)
 Adventures in Rhythm (Columbia, 1954)
 Rugolomania (Columbia, 1955)
 New Sounds by Pete Rugolo (Harmony, 1954–55, [1957])

With Jack Montrose
 Arranged by Montrose (Pacific Jazz, 1954)
 Arranged/Played/Composed by Jack Montrose (Atlantic, 1955)
 Jack Montrose Sextet (Pacific Jazz, 1955)

With Maynard Ferguson
 Dimensions (EmArcy, 1955)
 Maynard Ferguson Octet (EmArcy, 1955)

With Spud Murphy
 Four Saxophones in Twelve Tones (GNP Crescendo, 1955)

With Dave Pell
 Jazz & Romantic Places (Atlantic, 1955)

With Shorty Rogers
 Shorty Rogers Courts the Count (RCA Victor, 1954)

References

American jazz baritone saxophonists
Cool jazz saxophonists
1928 births
1955 deaths
Musicians from St. Louis
20th-century American saxophonists
Jazz musicians from Missouri